Adolf Weil (25 December 1938 – 12 May 2011) was a German professional motocross racer. He competed in the FIM 250cc and 500cc Motocross Grand Prix world championships as a rider for the Maico factory racing team between 1966 and 1978.



Motocross career
Weil began competing in the motocross world championships in 1966. He finished second to Håkan Andersson in the 1973 250cc World Championship, and finished in third place three times in the 500cc World Championship. While he was never able to capture an international title, he won 14 German motocross national championships. Weil won the 1973 Trans-AMA championship at the age of 34. He was known as the 'Iron Man' of motocross because he competed for over 20 years in a physically demanding sport that is dominated by younger riders. He raced his entire career on Maico motorcycles.

In 1976, Weil was awarded the Silver Laurel Leaf, the highest state award for athletic performance in Germany. After retiring from competition in 1978, he ran a motorcycle business with his two sons Frank and Jürgen in his hometown of Solingen, Germany.

Motocross Grand Prix Results

References 

1938 births
2011 deaths
People from Solingen
Sportspeople from Düsseldorf (region)
German motocross riders
Recipients of the Silver Laurel Leaf